Maxime Jacob, or Dom Clément Jacob, (13 January 1906 in Bordeaux – 26 February 1977 in Abbaye En-Calcat, Dourgne, Tarn) was a French composer and organist.

Biography

Jacob studied at the Paris Conservatory with Charles Koechlin and André Gedalge; an admirer of Darius Milhaud and Erik Satie, he was a member of the École d'Arcueil, a group of young composers sponsored by Satie after his rupture with his previous group of protégés, Les Six. Other members of this short-lived group included Henri Cliquet-Pleyel, Henri Sauguet and Roger Désormière.

In 1927, Jacob worked with Antonin Artaud at the Théâtre Alfred Jarry composing the score for his production of Ventre brûlé; ou La Mère folle (1927).:252

In 1929, Jacob converted from Judaism to Catholicism (influenced by Jacques Maritain) and became a Benedictine monk. He would go on to study organ with Maurice Duruflé, as well as Gregorian chant.

Jacob also published two books, L'art et la grâce (1939) and Souvenirs a deux voix (1969).

In the English-speaking world, his hymn tune "Living God" in 77.77 meter with 77.77 refrain, used for I Received the Living God (J'ai reçu le Dieu vivant), is well known.

Notes

Works
Vocal
Par la Taille (opera, after Alfred Jarry)
Le Vitrail de Sainte-Thérèse (oratorio, 1952)
Joinville et Saint-Louis (oratorio, after Péguy, 1971)
Les psaumes pour tous les temps (1966)
ca. 400 stage songs

Orchestral
Ouverture (1923)
Piano Concerto, 1961

Chamber music
8 string quartets

Miscellaneous
Piano pieces for Clément Doucet
Livre d'orgue (1967)

Further reading
Marie-Rose Clouzot (1969), Souvenirs en deux voix:  De Maxime Jacob à dom Clément Jacob, Toulouse:  Privat.  
Don Randel, The Harvard Biographical Dictionary of Music. Harvard, 1996, p. 413.

1906 births
1977 deaths
Converts to Roman Catholicism from Judaism
Conservatoire de Paris alumni
French classical composers
French male classical composers
20th-century classical composers
French Benedictines
20th-century French composers
20th-century French male musicians